Romain Marcel Georges Vincelot (born 29 October 1985) is a French former footballer who played as a midfielder in France and England across a 17-year career.

He played for Chamois Niortais, Gueugnon, Dagenham & Redbridge, Brighton & Hove Albion, Gillingham, Leyton Orient, Coventry City, Bradford City, Crawley Town, Shrewsbury Town and Stevenage.

Career

France and Dagenham
Born in Poitiers, Vincelot started his career with Chamois Niortais, where he made 46 league appearances in four years, three of which in Ligue 2 and one in the Championnat National (third tier). He moved to FC Gueugnon in 2008 and played 20 league games for the side during the 2008–09 Championnat National campaign.

He was released by the club in the summer of 2009 and spent the following six months without a team before signing for Dagenham & Redbridge on 22 January 2010. He made his Football League debut the next day, coming on as a substitute in the 1–2 defeat to Shrewsbury Town. He scored his first goal for the club in a 2–1 home win over Burton Albion on 17 April. Despite being signed as a full-back, the Dagenham manager John Still played him the centre of midfield. He played in the winning team in the League Two playoff final at Wembley on 30 May, when they beat Rotherham United 3–2.

In the 2010–11 season, Vincelot ended as top league scorer for Dagenham & Redbridge with 12 goals, although they were relegated back to League Two. This included a header in each half of a 2–0 win over East London neighbours Leyton Orient on 4 September 2010.

Brighton & Hove Albion and Leyton Orient
On 15 July 2011, Vincelot signed for newly promoted Championship side Brighton & Hove Albion on a two-year deal for an undisclosed fee estimated as £100,000. He made his debut on 9 August in a League Cup first round 1–0 win over Gillingham. On 26 November, he scored his only goal of 20 appearances for the Seagulls, the winner in a 2–1 victory over Coventry City at the Falmer Stadium. He was sent off after six minutes of a 1–0 loss at home to Burnley on 17 December for fighting Marvin Bartley, with teammate Ashley Barnes joining him six minutes later.

Having taken no part for Brighton in the 2012–13 season, Vincelot joined League Two side Gillingham on a two-month loan deal on 26 October 2012. He made nine appearances for the Gills and scored on his debut for the "Gills", and scored the only goal of a win at AFC Wimbledon on his debut a day after signing.

On 31 January 2013, Vincelot left Brighton after his contract was terminated. A week later he signed a short-term contract at League One side Leyton Orient, followed by a three-year contract at the end of the season.

At Orient, Vincelot became a regular in the first team during the 2013–14 season, appearing in the League One play-off final defeat to Rotherham United at Wembley. On 27 August 2014, he scored Orient's winner in the 1–0 League Cup victory over Premier League Aston Villa at Villa Park.

Coventry City
On 8 July 2015, Vincelot signed a two-year contract at Coventry City for an undisclosed fee.

Bradford City
After spending only one season at Coventry City, Vincelot moved to Bradford City in July 2016, on a two-year contract for an undisclosed fee. He replaced Stephen Darby as Bradford's captain.

Crawley Town
On 19 July 2018, Vincelot signed for EFL League Two club Crawley Town on a two-year deal for an undisclosed fee.

Shrewsbury Town
The following January, he moved to EFL League One club Shrewsbury Town, managed by his former Coventry teammate Sam Ricketts. He made his debut for "the Shrews" on 2 February, a 3–0 home defeat to Luton Town. Having not played since August, in October 2019 he underwent hip resurfacing, and was reportedly the first footballer to undergo that surgery that received attention when performed on tennis player Andy Murray.

He was released by the club on 11 June 2020.

Stevenage 
On 24 July 2020, Vincelot signed for League Two club Stevenage, making him the club's sixth summer signing. This would prove to be his final club as at the end of the 2020–21 season, Vincelot announced his retirement aged 35.

Career statistics

Club

References

External links

1985 births
Living people
Sportspeople from Poitiers
French footballers
French expatriate footballers
Association football defenders
Association football midfielders
Chamois Niortais F.C. players
FC Gueugnon players
Dagenham & Redbridge F.C. players
Brighton & Hove Albion F.C. players
Gillingham F.C. players
Leyton Orient F.C. players
Coventry City F.C. players
Bradford City A.F.C. players
Crawley Town F.C. players
Shrewsbury Town F.C. players
Stevenage F.C. players
Ligue 2 players
Championnat National players
English Football League players
Expatriate footballers in England
French expatriate sportspeople in England
Footballers from Nouvelle-Aquitaine